Vek Perevoda (Russian: Век Перевода, “The Age Of Translation”) is a website devoted to history and practice of the Russian poetical translation from the end of the 19th century up to the present time. The website was founded in 2003 by the famous Russian writer and translator Eugen V. Witkowsky. At first it was based on the materials of the anthology “Strophes Of The Century, part 2”, collected by Witkowsky since the 1960s. Conceptually, the site is a constantly updated anthology and guide. Vek Perevoda is the largest web-project in Russian devoted to foreign poetry; the works of more than 1000 Russian translators are published there. The anthology of the same name is being issued by the founder since 2005.

This website contains Russian translations of the poetical works from dozens of foreign languages including Quechua, Welsh, Romansh, Kashubian, Scottish Gaelic and other languages previously almost unknown in Russia. Among the most significant publications are: the first complete Russian translation of the “Bateau ivre” by Arthur Rimbaud (1910); translation of the works by José de Espronceda; sonnets of Michelangelo translated by Vyacheslav Ivanov etc.

Domain vekperevoda.com is registered in the United States.

References

Russian literature websites